The Rural Municipality of Weyburn No. 67 is a rural municipality (RM) in the Canadian province of Saskatchewan within Census Division No. 2 and  Division No. 1. It is located in the southeast portion of the province.

History 
The RM of Weyburn No. 67 incorporated as a rural municipality on December 13, 1909.

Geography

Communities and localities 
The following urban municipalities are surrounded by the RM.

Cities
 Weyburn

Villages
 McTaggart

The following unincorporated communities are located within the RM.

Organized hamlets
 North Weyburn

Localities
 Grassdale
 Mansur
 Ralph
 Talmage

Demographics 

Government 
The RM of Weyburn No. 67 is governed by an elected municipal council and an appointed administrator that meets on the second Wednesday of every month. The reeve of the RM is Norm McFadden while its administrator is Jenna Smolinski. The RM's office is located in Weyburn.

Transportation 
The RM is bisected by both Highway 13, Highway 35 and Highway 39 and is home to the Weyburn Airport.

References

External links 

Weyburn

Division No. 2, Saskatchewan